Luo Ronghuan (November 26, 1902 – December 16, 1963) was a Chinese communist military leader. He served as a Vice Chair of the Standing Committee of the National People's Congress.

Biography
Luo was born in a village in Hengshan County, Hunan Province. In 1919, at the age of 17, he enrolled in Xiejun Middle School in Changsha. Five years later, he began attending Shandong University (then Qingdao Private College), completing a preparatory course in Industry in Commerce in 1926. He joined the Chinese Communist Youth League in April 1927 and the Chinese Communist Party later that year. He was the only one of the later ten Marshals to have followed Mao in the Autumn Harvest Uprising. During the Long March he served as the security chief for the Chinese Red Army.

After World War II, Luo served as the political commissar of Lin Biao in Northeast China during the Chinese civil war. 

After the formation of the People's Republic of China in 1949 he became Chief of Staff of the People's Liberation Army. He was made a marshal in 1955.

Luo was the member of the 7th CPC Central Committee and 8th CPC Politburo. When Luo died in 1963, both Mao and Lin Biao attended his funeral; his funeral was one of the only two funerals Marshal Lin Biao attended, the other being the funeral of his former chief of staff and commander-in-chief of the PLA air force General Liu Yalou.

References

External links 
  Biography of Luo Ronghuan, Xinhuanet

See also 
 List of generals of the People's Republic of China

1902 births
1963 deaths
Chinese military personnel of World War II
Marshals of the People's Republic of China
People from Hengshan County
Chinese Communist Party politicians from Hunan
People's Republic of China politicians from Hunan
Politicians from Hengyang
Members of the 8th Politburo of the Chinese Communist Party
Vice Chairpersons of the National People's Congress
Procurator-General of the Supreme People's Procuratorate
Burials at Babaoshan Revolutionary Cemetery
National Wuhan University alumni